Domenik Schierl (born 20 July 1994) is an Austrian footballer who plays as a goalkeeper for SC Austria Lustenau.

Career
Schierl began with TSV St. Johann im Pongau with football and moved in December 2007 to FC Red Bull Salzburg. He went through the junior classes and in 2011 was second goalkeeper behind Thomas Dähne at the FC Liefering and thereafter at FC Liefering. On August 16, 2013, he made his First League debut in the goal of FC Liefering at 3: 0 home win against SV Horn.

At the end of the 2013/14 season he transferred to SC Wiener Neustadt in the Erste Liga.

Honours
Austria Lustenau
 Austrian Football Second League: 2021–22

References

External links

1994 births
Austrian footballers
Living people
SC Wiener Neustadt players
SC Austria Lustenau players
FC Liefering players
Austrian Football Bundesliga players
2. Liga (Austria) players
Austrian Regionalliga players
Association football goalkeepers